William Wickham Welch (December 10, 1818 – July 30, 1892) was an American Party member of the United States House of Representatives from Connecticut's 4th congressional district from 1855 to 1857.

Early life 
Born in Norfolk, Connecticut, Welch studied medicine. He was the son of Dr. Benjamin Welch  and Elizabeth Loveland Welch. He was graduated from the medical department of Yale College in 1839 and commenced practice in Norfolk.

Political career 
He served as member of the Connecticut House of Representatives from 1848 to 1850. He served in the Connecticut Senate in 1851 and 1852.

Welch served as a member of the Thirty-fourth Congress from March 4, 1855 to March 3, 1857. After his term, he resumed the practice of his profession.

He was again a member of the Connecticut House of Representatives in 1869 and 1881.

He died in Norfolk, Connecticut, July 30, 1892. He was interred in Center Cemetery.

External links

References

1818 births
1892 deaths
People from Norfolk, Connecticut
Know-Nothing members of the United States House of Representatives from Connecticut
Connecticut state senators
Members of the Connecticut House of Representatives
Physicians from Connecticut
Yale School of Medicine alumni
19th-century American politicians
Members of the United States House of Representatives from Connecticut